Meshgin Shahr County is in Ardabil province, Iran. The capital of the county is the city of Meshginshahr. At the 2006 census, the county's population was 156,141 in 36,470 households. The following census in 2011 counted 151,156 people in 40,954 households. At the 2016 census, the county's population was 149,941 in 45,999 households.

Administrative divisions

The population history and structural changes of Meshgin Shahr County's administrative divisions over three consecutive censuses are shown in the following table. The latest census shows five districts, 12 rural districts, and six cities.

References

 

Counties of Ardabil Province